Mark Smith (born November 19, 1935) is an American novelist. A professor of English at the University of New Hampshire, he is the author of several books, including Toyland (1965), The Middleman (1967), Doctor Blues (1983), and Smoke Street (1984).  His The Moon Lamp (1976) and The Delphinium Girl (1980) were Book of the Month Club selections. Smith is best known for The Death of the Detective (1973), nominated for the National Book Award in 1974, and a New York Times bestseller. The Death of the Detective was reprinted in 2015 by Brash Books.

References

External links
 Lots of Lunch Meat  Time review of Death of the Detective

1935 births
20th-century American novelists
American male novelists
Living people
20th-century American male writers